Nick Taylor (born 24 September 1971, in Oldham, Lancashire, England) is a professional squash player and squash coach from the United Kingdom.

Taylor reached a career-high world ranking of World No. 14 and England No. 3 in 2001. He was runner-up at 1996 and 2001 British National Squash Championships. He also won the European Squash Championships in 1996 and 1997.

Nick has won the Over 35's British Open and Closed Squash Championships and was the director of squash for Jersey in the Channel Islands from 2008 to 2017. In 2018, he won his first World Masters Squash Championships title.

Nick is currently the Director of Squash at Cross Courts in Natick, Massachusetts. Before, he was the Director of INFINITUM Squash in Sudbury, Massachusetts in the United States.

External links 
 INFINITUM Squash
 Official website
 Profile at psa-squash.com 
 

1971 births
Living people
English male squash players
Sportspeople from Oldham
Jersey squash players